The Seal of the President or Presidential Seal is a symbol often used to represent and authenticate documents coming from the president:

 Seal of the President of Ireland
 Seal of the President of Nigeria
 Seal of the President of the Philippines
 Presidential Seal of Turkey
 Seal of the President of Ukraine
 Seal of the President of the United States